Dorcadion kindermanni is a species of beetle in the family Cerambycidae. It was described by Waltl in 1838. It is known from Turkey.

Subspecies
 Dorcadion kindermanni var. fuscoquadriplagiatum Breuning, 1946
 Dorcadion kindermanni var. fuscoreductum Breuning, 1946

References

kindermanni
Beetles described in 1838